Thirlstane is a locality and small rural community in the local government area of Latrobe in the North West region of Tasmania.
The 2016 census determined a population of 94 for the state suburb of Thirlstane.

History
The name comes from a former estate in the area. The locality was gazetted in 1967.

Geography
The waters of the Rubicon Estuary form part of the eastern boundary.

Road infrastructure
The B71 route (Frankford Road) runs through the locality from east to west. Route C708 (Woodbury Lane) starts at an intersection with B71 on the south-eastern boundary and runs through from south-east to north-east. Route C709 (Squeaking Point Road) starts at an intersection with B71 and runs through from south-west to north-east. Route C707 (Appleby Road) starts at an intersection with C709 and runs north-west before exiting.

References

Localities of Latrobe Council
Towns in Tasmania